Massimiliano Massimo (? - 1911) was an Italian Jesuit. He founded the Institute at first dedicated to the Virgin Mary and now named after him. He traced his descent from Quintus Fabius Maximus Verrucosus.

1911 deaths
19th-century Italian Jesuits
Italian educators
Year of birth missing